Nintendo is one of the world's biggest video game development companies, having created several successful franchises. Because of its storied history, the developer employs a methodical system of software and hardware development that is mainly centralized within its offices in Kyoto and Tokyo, in cooperation with its division Nintendo of America in Redmond, Washington. The company also owns several worldwide subsidiaries and funds partner affiliates that contribute technology and software for the Nintendo brand.

Main offices 

Nintendo (NCL) has a central office located in Minami-ku, Kyoto, Kyoto Prefecture, Japan and a nearby building, its pre-2000 headquarters, now serving as a research and development building, located in Higashiyama-ku, Kyoto, Kyoto Prefecture, Japan. Additionally, Nintendo has a third operation in Tokyo, Japan, where research and development and manufacturing are conducted. All three offices are interconnected and have video conferences often for communication and presentation purposes.

In 2009, it was revealed that Nintendo was expanding both its Redmond and Kyoto offices. Nintendo announced the purchase of a 40,000 square-meter lot that would house an all new research and development (R&D) office that would make it easier for the company's two other Kyoto R&D offices to collaborate as well as expand the total work force on new upcoming console development and new software for current and future hardware.

Nintendo owns several buildings throughout Kyoto and Tokyo housing subsidiary and affiliated companies. One of the more famous buildings was the Nihonbashi, Chuo-ku, Tokyo building – previously known as the Nintendo Tokyo Prefecture Building – was jokingly called The Pokémon Building, accommodates the complete Pokémon family which included The Pokémon Company, Creatures Inc., and Genius Sonority.

In 2020, Nintendo revealed that they were going to unify all four of their buildings in Tokyo into just one. With this, several divisions and affiliated companies came to be together in the same building, including Game Freak, Nintendo's subsidiary 1-Up Studio and after 13 years, HAL Laboratory with its Tokyo studio and headquarters.

Beginning in 2021, it was revealed Nintendo was planning to expand internal operations by renting an adjacent upcoming city facility and building a new development office next to the already existing Kyoto Research Institute. In April 2022, it was revealed Nintendo had acquired adjacent land to their headquarters, with plans to construct another development office there to open in 2027.

Buildings

Former offices 
 Nintendo Sapporo Office – Sapporo, Japan – closed
 Nintendo Fukuoka Office – Fukuoka, Japan – closed
 Nintendo Tokyo Prefecture Building – Tokyo, Japan – closed
 Nintendo Tokyo Office (previous) – Tokyo, Japan – closed

Divisions

Entertainment Planning and Development (EPD) 

The Nintendo Entertainment Planning & Development division was created on 16 September 2015, as part of a company-wide organizational restructure that took place under Nintendo's then newly appointed president, Tatsumi Kimishima. The division was created after the merger of two of its largest divisions, Entertainment Analysis & Development (EAD) and Software Planning & Development (SPD).

The division assumed both of its predecessors' roles, focusing on the development of games and software for Nintendo platforms and mobile devices; it also manages and licenses the company's various intellectual properties. Shinya Takahashi, formerly general manager of the SPD division, serves as general manager of the new division, as well as supervisor for both the Business Development and Development Administration & Support divisions. Katsuya Eguchi and Yoshiaki Koizumi maintained their positions as Deputy General Managers of EPD, which they previously held under EAD.

Platform Technology Development (PTD) 

The Nintendo Platform Technology Development division was created on 16 September 2015, as part of a company-wide organizational restructure that took place under Nintendo's then newly appointed president, Tatsumi Kimishima. The division was created after the merger of two Nintendo's divisions, the Integrated Research & Development (IRD), which specialized in hardware development, and System Development (SDD), which specialized operating system development and its development environment and network services.

The new division assumed both of its predecessors' roles. Ko Shiota, formerly Deputy general manager of the IRD division, serves as the general manager (GM), while Takeshi Shimada, formerly Deputy general manager of the Software Environment Development Department of the SDD division, serves the same role.

Business Development Division (BDD) 
The Nintendo Business Development division was formed following Nintendo's foray into software development for smart devices, such as mobile phones and tablets, in March 2014. They are responsible for refining Nintendo's business model for dedicated game system business, and for furthering Nintendo's venture into development for smart devices.

Research and Development Subsidiaries 
Although most of the research and development is done in Japan, there are also R&D facilities in the United States, Europe and China.

Nintendo Software Technology (NST) 

Nintendo Software Technology Corp. (or NST) is an American video game developer located inside of Nintendo of America's headquarters in Redmond, Washington. The studio was created by Nintendo as a first-party developer to create games for the North American market, though their games have also been released in other territories such as Europe and Japan, exclusively for Nintendo consoles.

The studio's best known projects include the Mario vs. Donkey Kong series, Crosswords series, Wii Street U and other video games and applications.

Nintendo Technology Development (NTD) 

Nintendo Technology Development Inc. (or NTD) is a Washington-based hardware focused Research & Development group for Nintendo. The group focuses on the creation of various software technologies, hardware tools, and SDKs for first-party use and third-party licensing across Nintendo platforms, in collaboration with the Nintendo Integrated Research & Development division led by Genyo Takeda. Several side projects and unreleased prototypes are commonly linked to this Washington based subsidiary. NTD is also responsible for some low-level coding.

Nintendo European Research and Development (NERD) 

Nintendo European Research & Development SAS (or NERD), formerly known as Mobiclip, is a Nintendo subsidiary, located in Paris, France. The team currently focuses on developing software technologies, such as video compression, and middleware for Nintendo platforms. While an independent company, Mobiclip was responsible for licensing video codecs for Sony Pictures Digital, Fisher-Price and Nintendo for the Game Boy Advance, Nintendo DS, Wii and Nintendo 3DS.

The team has recently been involved in the development of the Wii U Chat application, in co-operation with Vidyo.

Game Development Subsidiaries 

Most external first-party software development is done in Japan, since the only overseas subsidiaries are Retro Studios in the United States and Next Level Games in Canada. Although these studios are all subsidiaries of Nintendo, they are often referred to as external resources when being involved in joint development processes with Nintendo's internal developers by the Nintendo Software Planning & Development division.

1-Up Studio 

, formerly , is a Japanese Nintendo-funded and owned video game development studio opened on 30 June 2000 and based in Tokyo, Japan. On 1 February 2013, Brownie Brown announced on their official website that due to their recent co-development efforts with Nintendo, Brownie Brown are undergoing a change in internal structure, which includes changing the name of their company to 1-Up Studio.

The studio is known for the development of the Magical Vacation series, Mother 3 and A Kappa's Trail. Since 2013, it stands as a development support studio for Nintendo EPD.

iQue 

Originally a Chinese joint venture between its founder, Wei Yen, and Nintendo, manufactures and distributes official Nintendo consoles and games for the mainland Chinese market, under the iQue brand. The product lineup for the Chinese market is considerably different from that for other markets. For example, Nintendo's only console in China is the iQue Player, a modified version of the Nintendo 64. In 2013, the company became a fully owned subsidiary of Nintendo.

It became a translation and localization company for simplified Chinese since 2016 for Nintendo games. In 2018, it stopped to be a manufacturer for consoles at China and in 2019 began to hire programmers and testers to transition to be a supporting development company for Nintendo EPD.

Mario Club 

Originally a team within Nintendo itself, Mario Club Co., Ltd. was separated into a subsidiary in July 2009. The studio handles testing, quality control and debugging for Nintendo published titles.

Monolith Soft 

 is a Japanese video game development company that has created video games for the PlayStation 2, Nintendo GameCube, Wii, Nintendo DS, and cell phones. The company currently has two main studios, its Tokyo Software Development Studio, which is housed in the company's headquarters, and the recently opened Kyoto Software Development Studio. The company was previously owned by Bandai Namco, until 2007 when Bandai Namco transferred 80% of its 96% stake to Nintendo. At a later date the remaining 16% was sold so the company is currently 96% Nintendo owned and 4% third parties. A majority of Monolith Soft's staff are former employees of Square Co., who transferred to the new company shortly after the creation of Chrono Cross. They were previously involved with the creation of Xenogears, from which the Xenosaga series is derived.

Monolith Soft's Tokyo Software Development Studio is usually associated with the Xeno series, the Baten Kaitos series and Disaster: Day of Crisis, while its Kyoto Software Development Studio is currently a development co-operation studio.

NDcube 

NDcube Co., Ltd. (エヌディーキューブ株式会社 Enudī Kyūbu Kabushiki Gaisha) is a Nintendo subsidiary and Japanese video game developer based in Japan with offices in Tokyo and Sapporo. The company was founded on 1 March 2000, through a joint venture between Nintendo and advertising firm Dentsu, hence the Nd in the name. In 2010, Nintendo decided to buy out 96% of the shares, with ad partner Dentsu stepping aside. Since NDcube was founded, they have kept a low profile, working on various Japanese GameCube and Game Boy Advance titles. Two notable games that have reached western shores are F-Zero: Maximum Velocity and Tube Slider. As seen in the credits for Mario Party 9, NDcube indeed houses many ex-Hudson Soft employees, some vary between folks who have focused primarily on many other entries in the Mario Party series.

The company is currently best known for the Wii Party series and for taking over the Mario Party series, after Hudson Soft was absorbed into Konami.

Next Level Games 

Next Level Games is a Canadian video game developer based in Vancouver. The company has been working with Nintendo since 2005 with Super Mario Strikers, while since 2014, the company began to work exclusively under contract with Nintendo. In January 2021, Nintendo revealed they had purchased Next Level Games, after over a decade working with the developer per contract basis and 6 years having them working exclusively.

Next Level Games has worked on the two most recent entries in the Luigi's Mansion series, the Mario Strikers series, Punch-Out!! for the Wii, and Metroid Prime: Federation Force for the Nintendo 3DS.

Retro Studios 

Retro Studios, Inc. is an American video game developer based in Austin, Texas. The company was founded in October 1998 by Nintendo and the video game veteran Jeff Spangenberg after leaving Acclaim Entertainment, as an independent studio making games exclusively for Nintendo. The studio started with four Nintendo GameCube projects which had a chaotic and unproductive development, and did not impress Nintendo producer Shigeru Miyamoto, but he suggested they create a new game in the Metroid series. Eventually the four games in development were cancelled so Retro could focus only on Metroid Prime, which was released for the GameCube in 2002, the same year Nintendo acquired the studio completely by purchasing the majority of Spangenberg's holding stock.

Retro Studios is now one of the most renowned Nintendo first-party developers thanks to the development of the Metroid Prime series, assisting in Mario Kart 7, and for reviving the Donkey Kong Country series.

SRD 

SRD Co., Ltd., also known as Systems Research and Development, is currently a Nintendo subsidiary located in Kyoto, Japan. The company was founded in 1979 and began work with Nintendo on the Famicom in 1982. Since then they have assisted in the programming of games on nearly every Nintendo console for nearly every Nintendo-developed game. During Nintendo's early years, SRD was essentially the programming team of Nintendo as the company didn't have those until the 90s, where F-Zero was the last title the company worked as the main programmers. After this, SRD became a programming supporting company to Nintendo and continued as such, until February 2022 when Nintendo acquired the company to be their subsidiary.

Affiliate companies

Former divisions and subsidiaries

References 

Nintendo divisions and subsidiaries
development teams